Lagaba was a city in the historical region of southern Mesopotamia (now southern Iraq). It is the place of origin of many illicitly excavated clay tablets, all in Old Babylonian. More than 400 tablets are known to have originated there. Tablets from Lagaba are kept in various collections around the world, among which
 the Babylonian Collection at Yale University. Tablets from the Yale Babylonian Collection have been published by G.M. Beckman in the Catalogue of the YBC and by Oded Tammuz of Ben Gurion University many dated to the reign of  Samsuiluna,
 the Böhl Collection at The Netherlands Institute for the Near East at Leiden University, 
 the Ashmolean Museum in Oxford, 
 various others.

The precise location of Lagaba is unknown to this day. The first thorough investigation into the location of Lagaba was undertaken by Leemans, on the basis of tablets kept in Leiden. By reviewing a tablet from Lagaba kept in Yale, Tammuz in 1996 concluded it to be 15 km North-north-east of the city of Babylon, on the western bank of the Euphrates River.

References

See also
 Cities of the ancient Near East

Sumerian cities
Former populated places in Iraq